Hilda Ogden (also Crabtree) is a fictional character from the British ITV soap opera Coronation Street, one of the best-known of all the regular characters in the serial, whose name became synonymous with a classic hard-working Northern working-class woman. She was played by Jean Alexander from 1964 to 1987.

For much of her period as a character in the Street, Hilda worked as cleaner of The Rovers Return Inn. A gossip and busybody, many of her storylines were used for comedic purposes, though the character was equally used for dramatic effect; a scene in which she wept over the spectacles of her recently deceased husband Stan (Bernard Youens) has been hailed as one of the most moving images in television history.

Alexander quit the role of Hilda in 1987 after 23 years but was persuaded to reprise the part in 1990 for a one-off appearance as part of an ITV Telethon. She has also been seen in a spin-off video in 1998, in which another long-running character, Betty Williams (Betty Driver), visited her at her new home. Both of these appearances are considered canon to the show.

Arguably the serial's most popular character of all time, Hilda was voted the greatest TV character in a Radio Times poll of over 5,000 people. The typical appearance of Hilda, wearing hair curlers and a head scarf, has inspired art and catwalk themes. Despite various producers expressing their desire to see the character return, Jean Alexander was openly critical about the direction Coronation Street had taken, vowing never to reprise the role of Hilda again.

Alexander had previously appeared in 1962 as Mrs. Webb, the landlady of Joan Akers (Anna Cropper), who abducted baby Christopher Hewitt (Victoria Baker).

Development

Characterisation
Hilda Ogden, with her trademark hair curlers and pinny, has been described as "the classic hard-working class Northern woman. With a voice like breaking glass and a temper to match". Actress Jean Alexander explained her interpretation of Hilda's head scarf and curler look: "Like Hilda, my roots were in Liverpool and that's where I first noticed the curlers and headscarf look. The curlers were put under the headscarf by the factory girls. They had their hair tied up and scarves like that to stop their fashionable long hair getting caught up in the machinery at work. They had the curlers in place in case they got asked out on a date, so they'd be ready for a night out after the shift." Alexander stated in 2010 that she based Hilda on bits of differing, eccentric people she had seen in her youth in Liverpool.
 
A term that has been described as synonymous with Hilda Ogden is "busybody". Critic for The Guardian, Grace Dent, has suggested that Hilda "spent the 70s providing an unofficial town-crier service for Coronation Street scandal. Hilda was known to sleep propped up in bed with one eye open so she could see what time Ken Barlow (William Roache)'s female friends left, (or what time they were carried out in bodybags. Ken's never had much luck with women.)". She added that Hilda was the mould that other popular soap gossips were made from, including Dot Cotton (June Brown) from EastEnders, Lynda Snell from The Archers and Martha Huber from Desperate Housewives.

The Ogdens

The Ogdens, Hilda and her husband Stan (Bernard Youens), have been hailed as one of Coronation Street's favourite couples. The bickering pair stayed together through mishap and financial difficulty. A working-class couple, they remained a screen double act for 20 years until actor Bernard Youens died on 27 August 1984, forcing the writers of the soap to kill off Stan on-screen. A scene following Stan's screen funeral, showing Hilda weeping at the sight of Stan's signature spectacles, has been described as "one of the most moving moments in TV history" and "instrumental in winning [Jean Alexander] the Royal Television Society's Best Performance Award for 1984–1985". Neil Marland, who worked as Granada Television's stills photographer for 30 years, has described the scene as terribly poignant, adding, "Everyone was crying and the camera tracked in – she had to undo his handkerchief, and in it were his glasses. She broke down sobbing. And, of course, I had to do a picture of this. So I left her for a minute or so sobbing. Then, as I got nearer, I just went, 'Jean, Jean...' And she sat bolt upright and said, 'What picture do you want Neil? I'm only acting'. It was just amazing because everyone on the floor was in floods of tears."

Commenting on the screen partnership, actress Jean Alexander has said, "It was a real pleasure working with Bernard Youens, who played my screen husband, Stan. Any success I have had is really down to Bernard because we worked well as a team and each knew how the other would want to play a scene. It was a happy screen partnership but it was strictly professional. We didn't socialise after work." Alexander has stated that the Ogdens were a brilliant set-up: "They were the only couple in the street who were married – permanently. They were the only ones who owned their own house where everyone else rented, they stayed together and didn't stray or have affairs and, yes, they bickered among themselves but let anyone else criticise either of them and they would be up in arms."

Hilda and Stan Ogden were voted Britain's top romantic TV couple in 2002, in a poll of more than 5,000 people carried out by NTL:Home. They beat off competition from Friends''' couple Monica Geller and Chandler Bing (Courteney Cox and Matthew Perry) and Dot and Jim Branning from EastEnders (June Brown and John Bardon). In 2005 the couple topped another poll. The Ogdens were voted ITV's favourite TV characters in a survey by Broadcast magazine, which took place to coincide with the 50th anniversary of the network. They beat Minder's Arthur Daley and Prime Suspect's DCI Jane Tennison, who took second and third place respectively.

Departure

After 23 years playing Hilda, Jean Alexander decided to leave Coronation Street in 1987. According to Alexander in 2010, it was the right time to leave as the writers had run out of ideas for Hilda and as a character, Hilda had run out of steam. She added, "Her other half had gone and she would have just scraped along. I didn't want that." Alexander went to see the show's producer Bill Podmore to inform him she did not want to renew her contract.

Her decision to leave prompted an outcry from fans and a "Save Hilda" campaign was launched, as many did not realise that the actress had made her own decision to depart. Hilda's final scenes in the programme were aired on Christmas Day 1987, when the locals in the Rovers Return joined Hilda in what has been described as a "stirring rendition" of "Wish Me Luck as You Wave Me Goodbye".

On-screen, Hilda departed for Hartington, Derbyshire, to make a new life for herself as the housekeeper for Doctor Lowther. 27 million viewers watched. It remains the highest-rated episode in Coronation Street's history. It has been described as the most moving scene in Coronation Street that did not involve a death. The writer behind the "memorable" episode depicting Hilda Ogden's departure, which attracted a record soap opera audience, was Leslie Duxbury.

Since her departure in 1987, various producers have expressed their desire to see Hilda Ogden back on Coronation Street. In 1990, Jean Alexander reprised the role after two-and-a-half years as part of ITV's 27-hour charity telethon. The episode showed her visiting Stan's grave. In 1998, the character was resurrected again, as part of a special direct to video film.

However, in 2005 actress Jean Alexander ruled out ever returning to the role of Hilda Ogden, due to Coronation Street's overemphasis on sex and "who's sleeping with whom". She also criticised the soap for not being fun enough and she disapproved of the modern storylines, saying some are allowed to "drag on forever". She added:

A spokesperson for the soap responded to Alexander's criticism, saying, "We don't subscribe to Jean's opinions. Every week 12 million people across the country tune in to be entertained by the drama in Coronation Street." Alexander reportedly declined to return as Hilda as part of Coronation Street's 50th anniversary celebrations in December 2010. They allegedly offered her a large sum of money but her agent Joan Reddin stated: "She's not interested in getting involved again." When interviewed in 2010, Alexander further discussed her reasons for not wanting to return to the role of Hilda. She said, "It would be impossible for me to recreate Hilda. She would be totally different from the scrubber who left the Street [...] I'm sorry, after 23 years I couldn't recreate that character as she would be now – and I didn't want to play her as she was. Hilda would be about 91 now. She left to be housekeeper for the lovely doctor and be part of a village community. She has status now which is something she always wanted. I have changed so I'm sure she has. And I think the fans would be disappointed. It would have spoiled the memories people had of her."

Storylines

Hilda and her husband Stan (Bernard Youens) were first featured in Coronation Street in June 1964. A working class couple, beset with financial woes and few friends, many of the more established characters looked down on the Ogdens. Hilda worked as a charwoman, cleaning the Rovers Return, Mike Baldwin (Johnny Briggs)'s factory and private homes, while Stan cleaned windows.

Hilda and Stan had four children. Two children, Sylvia and Tony, were not seen on the series with the explanation that they were taken into care when Stan beat them while drunk. The two unseen children were rarely mentioned and by the 1970s, Hilda and Stan often stated that they had two children, naming Trevor as their "only son". Their other children were seen on the programme and were named Irma (Sandra Gough) (although she was born Freda Ogden and had chosen the name Irma when she left home) and Trevor (Jonathan Collins/Don Hawkins). Trevor stole money and ran away within the first six months of arriving on the Street, writing back home to ask Hilda to disown him. Hilda's daughter Irma worked at the Corner Shop and eventually married David Barlow (Alan Rothwell). Irma was crushed when David and her child were killed in Australia in 1970. Irma returned home for a few years, but then vanished, with the explanation being she had moved to Wales, and later Canada. Irma was not mentioned at all when Stan died and in later years, Hilda only ever stated she had two children when asked. She had little contact with her family. Trevor eventually married and gave Hilda and Stan a grandson and granddaughter, but was ashamed of the life his parents led and only made the occasional visit.

Lodging with the Ogdens from 1980 to 1983 was Eddie Yeats (Geoffrey Hughes), their surrogate son, and, after Stan died in November 1984 – just a year after celebrating their ruby wedding – Hilda got extra money by allowing Kevin (Michael Le Vell) and Sally Webster (Sally Whittaker) to live in one of her vacant rooms. Shortly afterwards Hilda's employers, the affluent Doctor Lowther (David Scase) and his wife (June Broughton), made the decision to sell their home and move to Hartington. However, on the night that Hilda helped Mrs Lowther pack away her treasured possessions, burglars broke into the house and violently assaulted them both. Doctor Lowther, who had gone out to get a takeaway meal, was horrified to discover his wife suffering what would be a fatal heart attack and Hilda seriously injured.

Although she made a full recovery physically, mentally she became afraid to be in her own home. When Doctor Lowther asked her to move to his cottage in Hartington and be his housekeeper, she jumped at the chance. When Hilda left the programme on Christmas Day 1987, she sang "Wish Me Luck As You Wave Me Goodbye", in her trademark trilling voice; it was watched by an aggregated audience of 26.65 million people, one of the highest audiences in British television history.

Hilda's most remembered attributes were her hair curlers which she almost always wore, her pinny, and her "muriel" in her living room, which first showed a scene of Alpine mountains but was later changed to a coastal scene with three duck ornaments flying over them (the middle duck, in a nose-dive position, was Jean Alexander's idea).  She considered herself clairvoyant and offered teacup readings.

Reception
The character of Hilda Ogden was very popular with the British public — in 1982 she came fourth behind the Queen Mother, Queen Elizabeth II, and Diana, Princess of Wales in a poll of the most recognisable women in Britain. Hilda Ogden has been branded as the "greatest-ever soap character" and "loved by millions the world over". In 2004 she was voted the greatest soap character in a Radio Times survey of 5,000 viewers, despite the character not physically appearing on screen for 17 years at the time. Actress Jean Alexander commented on the accolade: "I'm very flattered. It came totally out of the blue. I knew nothing about it. Friends rang to tell me and I was completely taken aback. I am surprised that so many people remembered Hilda, considering it was so long ago that I played her." She added in 2005 that she was amazed by the nation's enduring affection for Hilda. She said: "I've no idea why. I'm totally flummoxed. If they remember Hilda with such affection, then I'm happy and very flattered.. ..It means that I did a good job and that's what I set out to do. I had 23 wonderful years playing Hilda. I worked with some of the Street's legends – Pat Phoenix (Elsie Tanner), Violet Carson (Ena Sharples), one of TV's greatest characters, Jack Howarth (Albert Tatlock), Arthur Leslie and Doris Speed (Jack and Annie Walker), all now sadly gone."

Various celebrities are known to be among her fans, including Michael Parkinson, Laurence Olivier, writer Willis Hall, the former Poet Laureate John Betjeman and Russell Harty, who formed themselves into the British League for Hilda Ogden.

In 1984, a storyline involving Hilda and her husband Stan resulted in monetary claims to the council of an increase of 200%. Off-screen, actor Bernard Youens had become ill, so the writers at Coronation Street excused his screen absence by making Stan have an injury – he hurt his toe on a pavement and was bed-ridden. In the storyline, Hilda discovered that if a paving stone is sticking up over a certain measurement, a claim can be made against the council. Hilda sued Weatherfield council and won a payout. Councils all across the UK were reportedly "up in arms against Coronation Street", because subsequently, claims against them for people tripping up over paving stones that were three-quarters of an inch high, increased by 200 per cent.

In other media
In 1998 a straight-to-video Coronation Street spin-off film was released. It was entitled The Women Of Coronation Street and featured clips of the show's most famous females. The video saw the brief return of Hilda Ogden, who had not been seen in the soap since 1987; Betty Williams travelled to meet her at her new home. A spokesperson for Granada Television commented, "It shows what happens when Betty goes up to visit Hilda Ogden at her home in Derbyshire. She used to do cleaning work for a doctor and when he died he left her the house in gratitude. It'll be a souvenir fans want to keep." The original character design of Fireman Sam character Dilys Price was based on Hilda Ogden.

In popular culture
An image of Hilda Ogden in her signature hair rollers and head scarf has been used in artist David Knopov's series of silk prints. The artist said Lenny Henry, Bill Nighy and Elvis Costello are among the famous names who have bought 'a Hilda'.

Hilda Ogden was cited as one of the characters to influence New York's elite fashion scene in 2004. The straight-laced tweed and hair rollers "granny chic" style of Sixties Britain, much of the look was derived from early episodes of Coronation Street. Fashion stylist Katie Grand said: "There's something very interesting about working class Britain in the early Sixties. Coronation Street was black-and-white and so grimy. They just looked so cool. Hilda Ogden has her hair in curlers but is also in a fabulous tweed jacket and a really nice blouse."

The video for one of the rock band Queen's music videos, "I Want to Break Free", was based on characters from Coronation Street. Lead singer Freddie Mercury was said not to be a fan of any soap opera; however, when he was at home he would watch Coronation Street. So, in the song's video, the members of the band dressed in drag as some of the soap's most famous female characters. Mercury's style was based loosely on the character Bet Lynch (Julie Goodyear), while Brian May's style was modeled loosely on Hilda Ogden. The song peaked at number 3 in the UK singles chart, and remained in the chart for fifteen consecutive weeks from its release in April 1984.

In the 1980s, Boy George criticised the most controversial video of "Relax" by Frankie Goes to Hollywood by saying it represented a "Hilda Ogden view of homosexuality."

In 2017, a longstanding character in BBC Radio 4's The Archers'', Peggy Woolley inherits a cat named 'Hilda Ogden', after her hairdresser Fabrice breaks up with his partner and moves to a no-pets apartment. Since her arrival in Ambridge though she proved fierce, and drew blood more than once.

References 

Coronation Street characters
Television characters introduced in 1964
Female characters in television